Marumba indicus is a species of moth of the  family Sphingidae. It is known from India.

References

Marumba
Moths described in 1856